Widemouth may refer to:

Widemouth, West Virginia, a community in Mercer County
Widemouth Bay, in Cornwall, England
Widemouth Creek, a stream in West Virginia